Vatiswa Ndara (born 28 September 1970) is a South African actress and media personality.

Early years and education 
She was born in Middelberg which is located in the Eastern Cape province.

Career 
In 1994, she began her career as a news reader and compiler at Radio Transkei. She has also worked as a presenter at other radio stations including Radio Bob, Kaya FM, Metro FM, 5FM and Highveld Stereo. Her acting career began when she was offered the role of Ma'mfundisi in Generations. She has since starred in the television series Gaz'lam, Nomzamo, Home Affairs, Tsha Tsha, and Society. She appeared in the 2019 film Salvation.

Filmography 

 Generations
 Gaz'lam
 Nomzamo
 Home Affairs
 Society
 Shooting Stars
 90 Plein Street
 Ihawu le Sizwe
 Muvhango
 Igazi
 Ithemba
 Tsha Tsha
 Society
 Salvation (2019 film)

Open letter 
On 8 October 2019, Ndara wrote a 6-page letter to Nathi Mthethwa, the arts and culture minister, which was posted on Twitter. In the letter, she alleged that Connie Ferguson and Shona Ferguson’s company, Ferguson Films, mistreated actors in the entertainment industry. The letter went viral and sparked debates on the internet.

Awards and recognition 

 2006: She won the inaugural SAFTA award for Best Supporting Actress
 2008–2009: She was selected as a juror of the 2008 and 2009 International Emmy Awards. She judged in the category Best Performance by an Actress.
 2016: She was nominated the Best Actress in a TV Comedy category for 2016 SAFTA.
 2017: She received DStv's inaugural Mzansi Viewers’ Choice Award for Favourite Actress.

References

Living people
1970 births
South African media personalities
South African actresses